Kim Trengove is an Australian actress and journalist.

She remains best known for her role as Rachel Millsom in the television series Prisoner.

Other credits include: Infinity Limited, The Flying Doctors, Neighbours, Stingers Sons and Daughters, Blue Heelers and the Sullivans.  She appeared in the films Dusty, The Getting of Wisdom and Desolation Angels

Originally a trained newspaper journalist she now works as the Digital and Publishing Manager for Tennis Australia.

References

External links

20th-century Australian actresses
21st-century Australian actresses
Australian film actresses
Australian soap opera actresses
Living people
1984 births